Dholkichya Talavar is a Marathi dance reality show, where dancers compete to win the title of "Lavani Samradyni". The first two seasons were produced by Logical Thinkers and Ramesh Dev Production. The third season was produced by Logical Thinkers in July 2015. The fourth season was aired from March 2016 and the fifth season was aired from May 2017.

It is directed and produced by Santosh Kolhe, written by Chinmay Kulkarni and directed by Sukhvinder Singh Chauhan. The project was held by Vipul Avinash Mehta. It was a special season of the show as entertainment rather than competition shown on Colors Marathi in March 2016. Foreign artists like Suzanne Bernert have also taken part in this reality show.

Season

Contestants

Season 1
 Vaishali Jadhav - Winner
 Sneha Wagh
 Sonali Khare

Season 3
 Manava Naik
 Neha Pendse
 Shweta Salve
 Narayani Shastri
 Gayatri Soham

Season 4
The fourth season started on 21 March 2016. The episodes featured flash mobs, fusion with western dances, a property round and a live music round. Dipali Sayyad, Vishwas Patil, Shakuntala Nagarkar and Manasi Naik are the jury for this season. The anchor of the show is actor Subodh Bhave.

 Mrunmayee Gondhalekar = Winner
 Vaishnavi Patil = 1st Runner-up
 Sayali Paradkar = 2nd Runner-up
 Richa Agnihotri = Finalist
 Shuchika Joshi = Finalist
 Meera Joshi = Eliminated
 Nazneen Shaikh = Eliminated
 Aishwarya Badade = Eliminated; Re-entered as a wild card; Eliminated
 Sharmila Shinde (Actor who participated as a celebrity contestant) = Eliminated; Re-entered as a wild card
 Chani = Eliminated
 Akshaya Malvankar = Eliminated
 Sanika Abhyankar = Eliminated

Contestants in 2016 are
 Minakshi Poshe = Winner
 Palak More = Winner
 Rutuja Junnarkar = 1st Runner-up
 Ishwari Nimbore = 1st Runner-up
 Samruddhi Kelkar = 2nd Runner-up
 Dhanishthha Katkar = 2nd Runner-up
 Chinmayi Salvi = Eliminated; Re-entered as a Wild Card; Finalist
 Samruddhi Shendage = Eliminated; Re-entered as a Wild Card; Finalist
 Dhanashree Dhhomase = Finalist
 Anushka Deshpande = Finalist
 Snehal Patil = Eliminated
 Tanaya Acharekar = Eliminated
 Ankita Tare = Eliminated; Re-entered as a Wild Card; Eliminated
 Arya Angre = Eliminated; Re-entered as a Wild Card; Eliminated
 Dipali Naigaonkar = Eliminated
 Siddhi Tambe = Eliminated
 Apurva Undalkar = Eliminated
 Joya Khan = Eliminated
 Prachiti Kulkarni = Eliminated
 Bhumika Gauda = Eliminated
 Tejashree Gugale = Eliminated
 Chahat Shaikh = Eliminated
 Asmita Surve = Eliminated
 Shambhavi Bharekar = Eliminated

Reception

Ratings

References

External links 
 Dholkichya Talavar at Voot

Colors Marathi original programming
Marathi-language television shows
Indian reality television series